Fishing derby may refer to:

 Fishing tournament, a fishing contest among a group of anglers
 Fishing Derby, an Atari 2600 video game